Charlottenborg Palace is a large town mansion located on the corner of Kongens Nytorv and Nyhavn in Copenhagen, Denmark. Originally built as a residence for Ulrik Frederik Gyldenløve, it has served as the base of the Royal Danish Academy of Fine Arts since its foundation in 1754. Today it also houses Kunsthal Charlottenborg, an institution for contemporary art, and Danmarks Kunstbibliotek, the Royal Art Library.

History

Gyldenløve's mansion

The site was donated by King Christian V to his half brother Ulrik Frederik Gyldenløve on 22 March 1669 in connection with the establishment of Kongens Nytorv. Gyldenløve built his new mansion from 1672 to 1683 as the first building on the new square.

The main wing and two lateral wings were built from 1672 to 1677, probably under the architect Ewert Janssen. In 1783 the mansion was extended with a rear, fourth wing designed by Lambert van Haven. The bricks used were brought from Kalø Castle in Jutland, which Gyldenløve owned and had pulled down.

In his old age, the large mansion became too big for Gyldenløve, who sold it to the dowager queen Charlotte Amalie in 1700, hence the name. Gyldenløve built a new, smaller mansion on the corner of Bredgade and Dronningens Tværgade which became known as "Gyldenløve's little mansion", now Moltke's Mansion, after a later owner, where he lived until his death in 1705.

After King Christian V´s death in 1699 the queen mother, Charlotte Amalie, purchased the palace for 50,000 Danish crowns and it was renamed Charlottenborg Palace. In 1714, when the Queen Dowager died, the place was passed to King Christian VI. Renovations began in 1736–1737, and its use and users shifted for a period of time. A small theater was constructed and used for various concerts, operas and theatrical performances. The palace garden contained the Botanical Garden between 1778 and 1872.

The Royal Danish Academy of Arts
 
In 1701, the old Academy of Arts began its activities in the palace. The small school slowly grew and was finally formally inaugurated in the Charlottenborg Palace on March 31, 1754. In 1787, the ownership of the palace was transferred to the Royal Danish Academy of Art. The academy still occupies the palace.

Architecture
Charlottenborg is a four-winged, three-storey building designed in the Dutch Baroque architecture style but also with some Italian influence. The main wing towards the square has a central risalit flanked by two more pronounced, two-bay corner risalit. All three are topped by balustrades. The central risalit is decorated with Corinthian pilasters and a Tuscan/Doric portal with balcony The facade has sandstone decorations and window pediments.

The lower rear wing consists of three pavilions. The central pavilion has a Tuscan arcade below, niches with busts above, and a lantern on the copper-covered roof.

Interior
The floor plan is reminiscent of French castles. It has a piano nobile with a banquet hall above the main entrance, with access to the balcony, a ground floor with lower ceilings, and a second floors for servants with even lower ones. This arrangement became characteristic of mansions and upper-class town houses in the entire 18th century.

In the rear wing, above the arcade, there is a well-preserved domed Baroque room with a splendid stucco ceiling.

Contemporary activities
Royal Danish Academy of Art
Kunsthal Charlottenborg, Exhibition Hall
Danish National Art Library

Cultural references
In the 2015 drama film The Danish Girl, Charlottenborg is the location where Einar (Eddie Redmayne) and Gerda (Alicia Vikander) meet as students at the Royal Danish Academy of Fine Arts.

See also
Architecture of Denmark
Art of Denmark
Charlottenborg (disambiguation)

References

External links

Det Kongelige Danske Kunstakademi
Kunsthal Charlottenborg
Danmarks Kunstbibliotek

Palaces in Copenhagen
Tourist attractions in Copenhagen
Culture in Copenhagen
History of Copenhagen
Houses completed in 1677
Baroque architecture in Copenhagen
Royal Danish Academy of Fine Arts
Houses in Copenhagen
Gammelholm
1677 establishments in Denmark